Cicely Bertha Hale (5 September 1884 – June 1981) was an English suffragette, health visitor, and author. In 1908, having been inspired by hearing Christabel Pankhurst and Emmeline Pankhurst speak, she became an assistant to Mary Howe in the information department at the Women's Social and Political Union headquarters. While there she offered a news-cutting and research service, and in 1912 she became in charge of the department. She also typeset The Suffragette (eventually renamed The Britannia) until 1916, when her father retired and she was thus left without a home or an allowance. She then trained as a health visitor, as well as obtaining training for the certificate of the Central Midwives' Board. She eventually became  health visitor superintendent of the Salisbury Street clinic, holding the job for sixteen years. For nine years she wrote a weekly column about babies for the Woman's Own magazine. She also wrote the book Can I Help you with Baby?, which had three editions. In 1947 she met Mary Cuningham Chater, who was the music adviser to the Girl Guides Association, and she herself subsequently became division secretary to the Arun Valley Guides, as well as helping to assemble the International Song Books, running a Brownie group, and acting as camp nurse for three summers. She published her memoir in 1975, and after that spoke on the radio, in schools, and on television as one of a few living suffragettes.

She lived with policewoman Ann Campbell for twenty years. Campbell died in 1941, and Hale later lived in Mary Cuningham Chater's home from 1950 to 1965, after which they obtained homes next to each other.

Legacy
In 2018 a plaque and tree honoring Hale were dedicated in Marina Gardens, Littlehampton.

Further reading
A good long time: the autobiography of an nonagenarian, by Cicely B. Hale, published 1975

References

1884 births
1981 deaths
English writers
English suffragists